"Mariposa Traicionera" (Treacherous Butterfly) is the third radio single and seventh track from Maná's sixth studio album, Revolución de Amor (2002). On March 24, 2003, the song debuted at No. 39 on the US Billboard Hot Latin Tracks. Thirteen weeks later, the track became Maná's first No. 1 hit on July 5, 2003, and continued to chart on the US Billboard Hot Latin Tracks for another twenty-six weeks.

Charts

2003 version

2021 version

Award
Premio Lo Nuestro
2004: Pop Song of the Year

See also
List of number-one Billboard Hot Latin Tracks of 2003

References

2003 singles
Maná songs
Spanish-language songs
Songs written by Fher Olvera
Warner Music Latina singles